The Flag Officer-in-Charge, Humber was a Royal Navy officer who administered naval forces located at Immingham and Grimsby, Lincolnshire, England. His formation was sometimes known as the Humber Station or Humber Area. In World War I it was a sub-command of the Admiral of Patrols from 1914 to 1916, then came under the Commander-in-Chief at the Nore until 1921. In World War II the FOIC was responsible to the Commander-in-Chief, The Nore.

History
Prior to World War I an Admiral of Patrols was appointed to command the destroyer and torpedo boat patrol flotillas that were formed and operating from different bases down the east coast of Britain, from the Forth to the Humber. Immingham was headquarters for 7th Destroyer Flotilla from August 1914 to November 1918. In 1915 The Auxiliary Patrol a component force under the (ADMP) based at Grimsby was designated Auxiliary Patrol Area IX, during this period HMNB Immingham was also a submarine base for British D class submarine. During World War II the Humber Force received shore support from this station from 1939 to 1940. In 1941 various mine-laying and mine-seeping flotillas and groups were under the command.

Administration world war one

Senior Naval Officer, Grimsby

Post holders included:

Commanding Officer, Humber Area

Post holders included:

Administration world war two

Flag Officer-in-Charge, Humber
:Post holders included:

Flag Captain, Chief Staff Officer and in command of HM Naval Base Immingham
Post holders included:

Naval formations in this command
Various units that served in this command included:

Naval formations receiving shore support from this command
Various units that served in this command included:

References

Sources
 Bertke, Donald A.; Smith, Gordon; Kindell, Don (2012). World War II Sea War, Volume 3: The Royal Navy is Bloodied in the Mediterranean. Lulu Publishing. .
Friedman, Norman (2011). Naval Weapons of World War I. Barnsley, England: Seaforth Publishing. .
Gilbert, Martin (1977). Winston S. Churchill (1. American ed., 1. [Dr.] ed.). Boston: Houghton Mifflin. .
Harley, Simon; Lovell, Tony. (2017), "Grimsby - The Dreadnought Project". www.dreadnoughtproject.org. Harley and Lovell. 
Houterman, J.N. "Royal Navy Nore Command 1939-1945: Humber". unithistories.com. Houterman and Kloppes. 
Houterman, J.N. "Royal Navy (RN) Officers 1939-1945  -  P: Palmer, Edwin Mansergh". www.unithistories.com. Houterman and Kloppes. Retrieved 7 July 2018.
Parkinson, Jonathan (2018). The Royal Navy, China Station: 1864 - 1941: As seen through the lives of the Commanders in Chief. Leicester, England: Troubador Publishing Ltd. .

H
Military units and formations established in 1914
Military units and formations disestablished in 1945